Ghost Devices is an original novel by Simon Bucher-Jones, featuring the fictional archaeologist Bernice Summerfield. The New Adventures were a spin-off from the long-running British science fiction television series Doctor Who.

The title refers to an operating system that continues to recognize a piece of hardware after it has been disconnected from the system.

Ghost Devices introduces Clarence (named after the angel in It's a Wonderful Life). Clarence appears in the form of an angel, but is an artificial intelligence from the People. Clarence is an agent of God.

External links
The Cloister Library - Ghost Devices

1997 British novels
1997 science fiction novels
Virgin New Adventures
British science fiction novels
Novels by Simon Bucher-Jones